Lugano Arte e Cultura (LAC) is a polyfunctional cultural centre dedicated to music, visual and performance arts in Lugano, Switzerland. It houses the Museo d'Arte della Svizzera Italiana (MASI) and hosts events such as "LuganoInScena" and "LuganoMusica". The Orchestra della Svizzera Italiana has its base at the LAC.

History
Lugano Arte e Cultura was inaugurated on 12 September 2015. The director is Michel Gagnon. Gagnon was previously the artistic director of the Place des Arts in Montreal.

Architecture
The LAC centre was built by architect Ivano Gianola, an exponent of the Ticino School of architecture. The building has a total volume of 180,000 m3 and welcomes visitors in a 650 m3 entrance hall with large windows, aimed at rendering the boundary between indoor and outdoor. The cultural centre defines the Piazza Bernardino Luini, overlooking the lake of Lugano. The theatre and concert auditorium with 800 m2 allows seating for 1000 people. The museum is spread over three exhibition floors with a total surface area of 2500 m2.

Art Exhibitions
The LAC houses the Museo d'Arte della Svizzera Italiana (MASI). One floor houses displays from the museum's collection whilst the other two floors host temporary exhibitions. Since its opening, the MASI has organized exhibitions of Anthony McCall, Albert Oehlen, Nicolas Party and James Barnor. As from 2018 the director of the MASI is Tobia Bezzola.

References 

2015 establishments in Switzerland
Art museums and galleries in Switzerland
Museums in Ticino
Lugano
Art museums established in 2015
Culture in Lugano